Hartley Douglas Dent (February 15, 1929 – July 10, 1993) was a Canadian politician. He served in the Legislative Assembly of British Columbia from 1972 to 1975, as a NDP member for the constituency of Skeena.

References

British Columbia New Democratic Party MLAs
1929 births
1993 deaths